Zangwill is a surname. Notable people with the surname include:

Israel Zangwill (1864–1926), British author
Louis Zangwill (1869–1938), English novelist
Nick Zangwill (born 1957), British philosopher
Oliver Zangwill (1913–1987), British neuropsychologist